Tyla Hepi (born 15 June 1993) is a New Zealand professional rugby league footballer who plays as a  for the Featherstone Rovers in the Betfred Championship.

He previously played for Hull Kingston Rovers and Castleford Tigers (Heritage № 997) in the Super League, and on loan from Hull KR at the Gloucestershire All Golds in League 1. Hepi has also played for Whitehaven and Toulouse Olympique in the Championship, and the Wyong Roos in the NSW Cup. and in the Auckland Rugby League competition for the Point Chevalier Pirates.

Tyla is the son of coach and former player Brad Hepi.

References

External links

Castleford Tigers profile
Toulouse Olympique profile
Wyong Roos profile

1993 births
Living people
Castleford Tigers players
Featherstone Rovers players
Gloucestershire All Golds players
Hull Kingston Rovers players
New Zealand rugby league players
Expatriate sportspeople in France
New Zealand expatriate sportspeople in England
Point Chevalier Pirates players
Rugby league players from Auckland
Rugby league second-rows
Toulouse Olympique players
Whitehaven R.L.F.C. players
Wyong Roos players